Mandaq (also Romanized as Mandāq; also known as Mandak and Mîndâq) is a village in Qeshlaqat-e Afshar Rural District, Afshar District, Khodabandeh County, Zanjan Province, Iran. At the 2006 census, its population was 260, in 60 families.

References 

Populated places in Khodabandeh County